Redbird is an Americana / folk trio, comprising Jeffrey Foucault, Kris Delmhorst and Peter Mulvey. All three are artists on the Signature Sounds Recordings label and have regularly toured together. Foucault and Delmhorst are married.

Discography

Albums
  Redbird (2005, Signature)
Live at the Cafe Carpe (2011, Signature)

Members
 Jeffrey Foucault
 Kris Delmhorst
 Peter Mulvey

References

External links
 

American folk singers
American singer-songwriters
Signature Sounds artists